is a Japanese former handball player. She competed in the 1976 Summer Olympics where she scored 28 goals, being top scorer of the olympic tournament.

External links

1951 births
Living people
Japanese female handball players
Olympic handball players of Japan
Handball players at the 1976 Summer Olympics
Place of birth missing (living people)
20th-century Japanese women